Tilak Raj, is a former Indian cricketer who played for Baroda and Delhi. He was a left-hand batsman who is best known for being the unfortunate victim of Ravi Shastri's six sixes in an over in 1985. It was only the second instance of this in first-class cricket.

References

External links
 

1960 births
Living people
Indian cricketers
Baroda cricketers
Delhi cricketers
Indian emigrants to the United States
American sportspeople of Indian descent